Peter Kleibrink (born 12 April 1951) is a former West German handball player who competed in the 1976 Summer Olympics.

In 1976 he was part of the West German team which finished fourth in the Olympic tournament. He played all six matches and scored six goals.

References

1951 births
Living people
German male handball players
Olympic handball players of West Germany
Handball players at the 1976 Summer Olympics